Maritza Salas Kelly (born January 3, 1975) is a retired female track and field athlete, who competed in the sprints events during her career. She represented her native country, Puerto Rico, at the 2000 Summer Olympics, where she was eliminated in the first round of the women's 4x400 metres relay competition, alongside Militza Castro, Sandra Moya and Beatriz Cruz. Salas ran the fourth and last leg in the heat 2 race. She is the only daughter of Raul Salas and Vinetta Kelly.

References
sports-reference

1975 births
Living people
Puerto Rican female sprinters
Athletes (track and field) at the 2000 Summer Olympics
Olympic track and field athletes of Puerto Rico